Fernanda Oliveira may refer to:

 Fernanda Oliveira (sailor) (born 1980), Brazilian sailor
 Fernanda Oliveira (dancer) (born 1980), Brazilian ballet dancer

See also
 Fernando Olivera (disambiguation)
 Fernando Oliveira (born 1984), Brazilian footballer